On November 30, 1979 residents of Edmonton were asked whether they wished to repeal the municipal bylaw authorizing construction of a Trade and Convention Centre. This building is now known as the Edmonton Convention Centre. Construction of the centre was supported by the mayor, Cec Purves. 

As the question was about repealing a bylaw that allowed the construction of a Convention Centre, those favouring construction were required to vote "no" on the ballot. In order to avoid confusion, the pro-Convention Centre campaign propagated the slogan "No means go".

Voter turnout

There were 81,832 ballots cast out of 300,000 eligible voters, for a voter turnout of 27.3%.

Results

Are you in favour of the repealing of bylaw No. 5384, a bylaw authorizing the construction and maintenance of a Trade and Convention Centre?
Yes – 29,491
No – 51,611

There were 730 ballots rejected.

References
City of Edmonton: Edmonton Elections

1979
1979 elections in Canada
1979 in Alberta